Neomegalotomus is a genus of broad-headed bugs in the family Alydidae. There are at least two described species in Neomegalotomus.

Species
These two species belong to the genus Neomegalotomus:
 Neomegalotomus parvus (Westwood, 1842)
 Neomegalotomus rufipes (Westwood, 1842)

References

Further reading

External links

 

Articles created by Qbugbot
Alydinae
Pentatomomorpha genera